The 1998 Tulane Green Wave football team represented Tulane University in the 1998 NCAA Division I-A football season. The Green Wave finished with a record of 12 wins and no losses, one of only two NCAA Division I-A teams to complete the season undefeated, the other being the BCS champion Tennessee Volunteers. It was the third undefeated and untied season in school history.

Despite finishing undefeated, the Green Wave were not considered for a BCS game, let alone a berth in the 1999 Fiesta Bowl—that year's national title game—because it was felt their strength of schedule was too weak to justify a berth in a higher-tier bowl. They did not play a single ranked team all season, and the only Automatic Qualifying conference member on their schedule was a Rutgers team that finished tied for sixth in the Big East. Moreover, they were the only team in Conference USA with fewer than five overall losses. 

Tulane defeated Brigham Young in the Liberty Bowl. The Green Wave finished the season ranked seventh in the nation in both the AP Poll and Coaches' Poll—in both cases, its highest rankings in school history since the 1939 Tulane football season when they were ranked No. 5 in the AP Poll.

The Green Wave won all of their games by six points or more. The combined 538 points set a single-season school record.

Personnel

Coaching staff

Roster

Schedule

Rankings

Game summaries

at Cincinnati

at SMU

Navy

Southern Miss

Louisville

at Rutgers

SW Louisiana

at Memphis

at Army

Houston

Louisiana Tech

vs. BYU

Team players in the NFL

References

Tulane
Tulane Green Wave football seasons
Conference USA football champion seasons
Liberty Bowl champion seasons
College football undefeated seasons
Tulane Green Wave football